Dawn Break Up is a 2015 Chinese romantic drama film directed by Li Kai.

Cast
Daniel Chan
Yin Hang
Shone An
Li Juan
Luo Yan
Shen Xuewei

Reception
By June 2, 2015, the film had earned  at the Chinese box office.

References

2015 romantic drama films
Chinese romantic drama films
2010s Mandarin-language films